The 1943 Iowa Hawkeyes football team represented the University of Iowa in the 1943 Big Ten Conference football season. This was Slip Madigan's first season as head coach for the Hawkeyes.

Schedule

References

Iowa
Iowa Hawkeyes football seasons
Iowa Hawkeyes football